Mohamed Keita (born June 9, 1991) is a Guinean retired football player. He played for the Guinea national team under-23.

Career
Mohamed Keita is a professional football player who signed with AEK Athens in Greece. 
Mohamed Keita was selected with the Pre-National Team Selection ( A ) Guinea. 
In 2014 Keita was named among the Best Talented Footballer ( Soccer ) player in this Country.

Keita has played for Guinea under-23 national team. In he was selected with the first Group National Team ( A ) Guinea.

External links

1991 births
Living people
Guinean footballers
Association football defenders